Hartley is a civil parish in the Eden District, Cumbria, England.  It contains 16 listed buildings that are recorded in the National Heritage List for England.  All the listed buildings are designated at Grade II, the lowest of the three grades, which is applied to "buildings of national importance and special interest".  The parish is to the east of the town of Kirkby Stephen.  The South Durham and Lancashire Union Railway ran through it until the line closed in 1965, but two viaducts have survived and are listed.  Many of the other listed buildings are houses and associated structures, farmhouses and farm buildings.  The rest of the listed buildings comprise the ruins of a castle, two bridges, a boundary stone, a row of nine cairns, and a pinfold.


Buildings

References

Citations

Sources

Lists of listed buildings in Cumbria